"Jim Dandy" (sometimes known as "Jim Dandy to the Rescue") is a song written by Lincoln Chase, and was first recorded by American R&B singer LaVern Baker on December 21, 1955. It reached the top of the R&B chart and #17 on the pop charts in the United States. It was named one of The Rock and Roll Hall of Fame's 500 Songs that Shaped Rock and Roll and was ranked #352 on Rolling Stone's 500 Greatest Songs of All Time.

The song is about a man (Jim Dandy) who rescues women from improbable or impossible predicaments.  It proved popular enough that Chase wrote a second song for Baker entitled "Jim Dandy Got Married."

The American English term jim-dandy for an outstanding person or thing predates the song; first attested in 1844, it may itself come from the title of an old song, "Dandy Jim of Caroline".

The tenor saxophone solo is by Sam "The Man" Taylor  The drummer on the session was veteran Panama Francis. The backing vocals are provided by Atlantic's in-house backing group at the time, the Cues (credited as the Gliders), consisting of first tenor Abel DeCosta, second tenor Ollie Jones (formerly of the Ravens), bass Edward Barnes, and baritone Winfield Scott.

The song is the B-side to James Reyne's 1989 single, "One More River".

The song was featured in the 1972 John Waters film Pink Flamingos.

Black Oak Arkansas cover 

In 1973 the song was covered by southern rock band Black Oak Arkansas. It hit #25 on the pop chart and featured Jim Mangrum (who had already been using "Jim Dandy" as a stage name before they covered the song) and female vocalist Ruby Starr trading off vocals. It was the first single from their 1973 album High on the Hog, the band's most commercially successful album. In Canada, the song reached #13, and was #131 in the year-end top 200.

This version of the song was used in the 1993 film Dazed and Confused. A version by the Wright Brothers Band was used in the 1987 film Overboard. In the early-to-mid 2000s, a used car lot called J. D. Byrider produced a version replacing "Jim Dandy" with "JD" to advertise that they would "rescue" buyers with bad credit.

References

1957 singles
1973 singles
LaVern Baker songs
Songs written by Lincoln Chase
1957 songs
Atlantic Records singles
Atco Records singles
Songs about fictional male characters